Corynanthe brachythyrsus, synonym Pausinystalia brachythyrsum, was a species of plant in the family Rubiaceae. It was endemic to Cameroon.

References

Sources
 

Naucleeae
Endemic flora of Cameroon
Extinct plants
Extinct biota of Africa
Taxonomy articles created by Polbot
Taxobox binomials not recognized by IUCN